Springfield may refer to:
 Springfield (toponym), the place name in general

Places and locations

Australia 
 Springfield, New South Wales (Central Coast)
 Springfield, New South Wales (Snowy Monaro Regional Council)
 Springfield, Queensland
 Springfield, South Australia
 Springfield, Tasmania, a locality
 Springfield, Victoria (Shire of Buloke), in north-western Victoria
 Springfield, Victoria (Macedon Ranges), in central Victoria

Belize 
 Springfield, Belize

Canada 
 Rural Municipality of Springfield, in Manitoba
 Springfield (provincial electoral district), an electoral division in Manitoba
 Springfield Parish, New Brunswick
 Springfield, Kings County, New Brunswick, an unincorporated community
 Springfield, Newfoundland and Labrador
 Springfield, Nova Scotia
 Springfield, Ontario
 Springfield, Prince Edward Island

Ireland 
 Springfield, a townland in County Offaly
 Springfield, a townland in County Westmeath

New Zealand 
 Springfield, New Zealand

South Africa 
 Springfield, Gauteng

United Kingdom 
 Springfield, Birmingham, England
 Springfield, Caerphilly, a place in Caerphilly County Borough, Wales
 Springfield, County Fermanagh, Northern Ireland
 Springfield, Dumfries and Galloway, a place in Dumfries and Galloway, Scotland
 Springfield, Essex, England
 Springfield, Fife, Scotland
 Springfield, Highland, a place in Highland, Scotland
 Springfield (Hackney ward), London Borough of Hackney, England
 Springfield, Milton Keynes, England
 Springfield, Sandwell, a place in Sandwell, England
 Springfield, an area in Sutton Farm, a suburb of Shrewsbury, England
 Springfield, Wigan, a place in Wigan, England
 Springfield, Wolverhampton, England
 Springfield University Hospital, Tooting, London, England

United States 
 Springfield, Alabama, unincorporated community
 Springfield, Arkansas
 Springfield, California
 Springfield, Colorado
 Springfield, Florida, a city in Bay County
 Springfield (Jacksonville), Florida, a neighborhood
 Springfield, Georgia
 Springfield, Idaho
 Springfield, Illinois, the state capital of Illinois
 Springfield metropolitan area, Illinois
 Springfield, LaPorte County, Indiana
 Springfield, Posey County, Indiana
 Springfield, Kentucky
 Springfield, Louisiana
 Springfield, Maine
 Springfield, Massachusetts, the first Springfield settled in the US
 Springfield metropolitan area, Massachusetts, the most populous Metropolitan Springfield Area
 Springfield, Michigan, a city in Calhoun County
 Springfield Township, Oakland County, Michigan
 Springfield, Minnesota, in Brown County
 Springfield, Missouri, the most populous city named Springfield in the United States
 Springfield metropolitan area, Missouri
 Springfield, Nebraska
 Springfield, New Hampshire
 Springfield Township, Burlington County, New Jersey (referred to as "Springfield")
 Springfield Township, Union County, New Jersey (referred to as "Springfield")
 Springfield (CDP), New Jersey (Union County), the downtown area
 Springfield/Belmont, Newark, New Jersey, a neighborhood of Newark
 Springfield, New York
 Springfield, Ohio
 Springfield, Oregon
 Springfield Township, Pennsylvania (disambiguation)
 Springfield, South Carolina
 Springfield, South Dakota
 Springfield, Tennessee
 Springfield, Texas, Jim Wells County
 Springfield, former town and county seat of Limestone County, Texas, now part of Fort Parker State Park
 Springfield, Vermont
 Springfield (CDP), Vermont
 Springfield, Virginia
 Springfield, Albemarle County, Virginia
 Springfield (Coatesville, Virginia), a historic home
 Springfield, Page County, Virginia
 Springfield, Westmoreland County, Virginia
 Springfield, West Virginia
 Springfield, Dane County, Wisconsin, a town
 Springfield Corners, Wisconsin, an unincorporated community
 Springfield, Jackson County, Wisconsin, a town
 Springfield, Marquette County, Wisconsin, a town
 Springfield, St. Croix County, Wisconsin, a town
 Springfield, Walworth County, Wisconsin, an unincorporated community

United States Virgin Islands
 Springfield, U.S. Virgin Islands

Amtrak stations
 Franconia–Springfield station, Virginia
 Springfield station (Illinois)
 Springfield Union Station (Massachusetts)

People with the surname
 Adam Springfield (born 1982), American actor
 Dusty Springfield (1939–1999), English pop singer (born Mary O'Brien)
 Molly Springfield (born 1977), American artist
 Rick Springfield (born 1949), American pop singer
 Tom Springfield (1934–2022), English musician, songwriter, record producer, brother of Dusty (born Dion O'Brien)

Arts, entertainment, and media

Fictional characters 
 Jebediah Springfield, founder of Springfield, from The Simpsons
 Negi Springfield, the main anime character from Mahou Sensei Negima

Fictional places 
 Springfield (The Simpsons), hometown of the Simpson family in The Simpsons
 Springfield (Guiding Light), a community in the television soap opera Guiding Light
 Springfield, the setting of the American comedy TV series Father Knows Best

Music
 Springfield (album),  a 1996 album by Carole Fredericks
 "Springfield", a 2015 single by ItaloBrothers and Martin Tungevaag

Television
 "$pringfield (or, How I Learned to Stop Worrying and Love Legalized Gambling)", a 1993 episode of The Simpsons

Education
 RGS Springfield, mixed-sex junior school of RGS Worcester
 Springfield High School (disambiguation)
 Springfield School (disambiguation)
 Springfield School District (Delaware County), Pennsylvania
 University of Illinois Springfield

Historical events
 Attack on Springfield, in 1675, Springfield, Massachusetts, was burned to the ground during King Philip's War
 Battle of Springfield (1780), near Springfield, New Jersey, during the American Revolutionary War
 First Battle of Springfield, an October 25, 1861, battle of the American Civil War in Greene County, Missouri
 Second Battle of Springfield, a January 8, 1863, battle in the American Civil War fought in Springfield, Missouri
 Springfield race riot of 1908

Theme park areas
 Springfield (Universal Parks & Resorts), the area is themed around the fictional town of the same name from the American animated sitcom, The Simpsons

Other uses
 Springfield (horse), an English Thoroughbred racehorse
 MGM Springfield, a hotel and casino complex located in Metro Center, Springfield, Massachusetts
 Naismith Memorial Basketball Hall of Fame in Springfield, Massachusetts, referred to as "Springfield"
 Springfield Armory, in the city of Springfield, Massachusetts, the primary center for the manufacture of U.S. military firearms from 1777 until its closing in 1968
 Springfield rifle
 USS Springfield, any of several ships by that name

See also 
 Buffalo Springfield, a folk rock band
 Springfeld, Saskatchewan
 North Springfield (disambiguation)
 Springfield Plantation (disambiguation)
 Springfield Township (disambiguation)
 Springfields, a nuclear fuel production installation in Lancashire, England
 West Springfield (disambiguation)